Aykut Çeviker (born 3 January 1990) is a Turkish footballer who plays for Ankara Keçiörengücü. He played for the Turkey youth football teams.

Professional career
On 10 May 2018, Aykut helped Akhisar Belediyespor win their first professional trophy, the 2017–18 Turkish Cup.

Honours
Akhisarspor
 Turkish Cup (1): 2017-18
 Turkish Super Cup: 2018

References

External links

1990 births
People from Ankara
Living people
Turkish footballers
Turkey youth international footballers
Association football midfielders
Gençlerbirliği S.K. footballers
Kastamonuspor footballers
Hacettepe S.K. footballers
Bucaspor footballers
Balıkesirspor footballers
Akhisarspor footballers
Tuzlaspor players
Ankara Keçiörengücü S.K. footballers
Süper Lig players
TFF First League players
TFF Second League players